The Aster 15 and Aster 30 are a Franco-Italian family of all-weather, vertical launch surface-to-air missiles. The name "Aster" stands for "Aérospatiale Terminale" (French company Aérospatiale having been the project's lead contractor before its missile activities were merged into MBDA). It also takes inspiration from the word "aster", meaning "star" in Ancient Greek. The missiles as well as the related weapon systems are manufactured by Eurosam, a consortium consisting of MBDA France, MBDA Italy (both with a combined 66% share) and Thales (holding 33%).

The Aster missiles were developed to intercept and destroy the full spectrum of air threats from high-performance combat aircraft, UAVs and helicopters to cruise, anti-radiation and even sea-skimming supersonic anti-ship missiles. In addition, the Aster 30 Block 1 and Block 1 NT were designed to counter ballistic missiles.

The Aster is primarily operated by France, Italy, as well as the United Kingdom as an export customer, and is an integrated component of the PAAMS air defence system (known in the Royal Navy as Sea Viper). As the principal weapon of the PAAMS, the Aster equips the s in French and Italian service as well as the British Type 45 destroyers. It also equips the French and Italian FREMM multipurpose frigates, though not through the PAAMS air defense suite itself but specific French and Italian derivatives of the system.

History
During the 1980s, the predominant missiles in Franco-Italian service were short-range systems such as the French Crotale, Italian Selenia Aspide or American Sea Sparrow, with ranges up to a dozen kilometres. Some vessels were also equipped with the American medium/long range RIM-66 Standard.  France and Italy decided to start development of a domestic medium/long range surface-to-air missile to enter service in the first decade of the 21st century, that would give them comparable range but superior interception capability to the American Standard or British Sea Dart already in service. Thought was given in particular to the new missile's ability to intercept next-generation supersonic anti-ship missiles, such as the BrahMos missile developed jointly by India and Russia. This allowed the actual systems to have the characteristic of being specialised either in short-to-medium range "point defence" for e.g. ships, or in medium-to-long range "zone defence" of fleets.

In May 1989, a Memorandum of understanding was signed between France and Italy for the development of a family of future surface-to air-missiles. Eurosam was formed shortly afterwards. By July 1995 development had taken shape in the form of the Aster missile and test firing of the first Aster 30 took place. A Phase 2 contract was awarded in 1997 at US$1 billion for pre-production and development of the French-Italian land and naval systems.

During development trials between 1993 and 1994 all flight sequences, altitudes and ranges, were validated. This was also the period during which the launch sequence of Aster 30 was validated.  In May 1996, trials of the Aster 15 active electromagnetic final guidance system against live targets began. All six attempts were successful. Again during 1997 Aster was extensively tested, this time being pitted against targets such as the Aerospatiale C.22 target and first generation Exocet anti-ship missiles. In numerous engagements Aster scored direct impacts on its targets. During one such engagement on 13 November 1997 in a strong countermeasures environment, the Aster was not armed with its military warhead so that the distance between the Aster and the target could be recorded. The target (a C22) was recovered bearing two strong cuts made by the fins of the Aster missile.

In May 2001 Aster had again successfully completed the "manufacturer's validation firing test" and was deployed for the first time on the French nuclear-powered aircraft carrier . Again on 29 June 2001, the Aster achieved a successful interception of an Arabel missile at low altitude in less than five seconds. The first ever operational firing of the Aster missile took place during October 2002 on board Charles de Gaulle. Finally in November 2003 Eurosam was awarded the 3 billion euro Phase 3 production contract which saw full production commence and exports to France, Italy, Saudi Arabia and the United Kingdom. The resulting Aster surface-to-air missile meets inter-service and international requirements, addressing the needs of the land, air and naval forces of France, Italy and the United Kingdom. The decision to base the missile around a common terminal intercept "dart" to which different sized boosters can be attached has made it modular and extensible.

From 2002 to 2005, the Italian experimental frigate  provided a test bed for live firing trials of the Aster 15 from Sylver A43 launchers with EMPAR and SAAM-it systems, and the trials of Aster 30 from Sylver A50 launchers with EMPAR and PAAMS(E) systems. , France had spent €4.1bn at 2010 prices on 10 SAMP/T launchers, 375 Aster 30 missiles and 200 Aster 15 missiles. Another 80 Aster 30 and 40 Aster 15 were purchased for France's s under a separate programme.

On January 28, 2023, the Italian and French Minister of Defense signed with MBDA a $2 billion contract for the purchase of 700 Aster missiles.

Characteristics
There are currently two versions of the Aster missile family, the short-medium range version, Aster 15, and the long range version, Aster 30. The missile bodies are identical; their difference in range and intercept speed is because Aster 30 uses a much larger booster. Given the larger dimensions of the Aster 30, a naval based system requires the longer tubes of the Sylver A50 or A70 vertical launching system (VLS). Additionally the American Mark 41 Vertical Launching System can accommodate Aster 30.

Variants
 Aster 15 – Ship point and local area defence
 Aster 30 Block 0 – Ship local and wide area defence
 Aster 30 Block 1 – an anti-ballistic missile intercept upgrade against 600-km-class short range ballistic missiles (SRBMs)
 Aster 30 Block 1NT (New Technology) – a further anti-ballistic missile intercept upgrade against a range-class of  medium-range ballistic missiles (MRBMs)
 Aster 30 Block 2 BMD currently being developed for anti-ballistic defense against -range maneuvering missiles.

The Aster 30 Block 1 is used on the Eurosam SAMP/T system operated by the French Air Force and the Italian Army. , the Block 1NT variant is being developed by MBDA France and funded by France and Italy. In 2016, the United Kingdom showed interest in acquiring the Block 1NT version for its Type 45 destroyers currently operating the Block 0. In 2022, the United Kingdom announced a series of upgrades to its Type 45 destroyers. This included the implementation of the Block 1 version for anti-ship ballistic missile defense.

Deployment

Naval systems

 
 
 
 Type 45 destroyer
 FREMM multipurpose frigate
 
 Al Riyadh-class frigate
 Kalaat Béni Abbès class
 Frégate de défense et d'intervention
 Thaon di Revel-class offshore patrol vessel

Land systems

The Aster 30 has been incorporated by Eurosam into a mobile SAM system, fulfilling the ground-based theatre air defence/protection requirement. It comes in the form of the Sol-Air Moyenne-Portée/Terrestre (French for "Surface-to-Air Medium-Range/Land-based"), commonly known as SAMP/T. The system uses a network of radars and sensors – including 3D phased array radar – enabling it to be effective against various air threats such as aircraft, tactical ballistic missiles, standoff missiles, cruise missiles or anti-radiation missiles. The SAMP/T uses an upgraded version of the Arabel long range radar, developed under the Aster 30 block 1 upgrade program, in order to extend the system's capability against higher speed and higher altitude targets. The Aster 30 Block 1 can intercept missiles with a  range (short-range ballistic missiles).

Testing

Then again in 2010, a frigate of the same class, RSS Supreme fired an Aster 15 and shot down an aerial drone off the coast of Hawaii as part of exercise RIMPAC 2010. The RSN conducted 6 successful live-firings of the Aster missile over 11 years.
In December 2011, an Aster 30 missile downed an Israeli Black Sparrow ballistic missile target, the first time an Aster missile had attempted such an engagement.
It was the first time a European missile defence system destroyed a supersonic sea-skimming "missile". The trial was described as a "complex operational scenario".
In 2021, during the Exercise At-Sea Demo: Formidable Shield 2021, the Horizon-class frigate Forbin, intercepted a supersonic (>3000 km/h) sea skimming target using an Aster 30 missile.

Operators

Current operators
 Algeria
 Algerian National Navy – 

 Egypt
 Egyptian Navy

 France
 French Navy
 French Air Force

 Greece
 Hellenic Navy - Aster 30 for FDI HN frigates

 Italy
 Italian Navy
 Italian Army

 Morocco
 Royal Moroccan Navy

 Qatar
 Qatar Navy

 Saudi Arabia
 Royal Saudi Navy

 Singapore
 Republic of Singapore Navy
 Republic of Singapore Air Force

 United Kingdom
 Royal Navy

Potential operators

 Turkey
Turkish Air Force – On 5 January 2018, a contract was signed during a state visit by the President of Turkey in Paris for a project with Eurosam for a future Long Range Air and Missile Defense System (LORAMIDS) for a period of 18 months where Turkish companies Roketsan and Aselsan would participate in the joint-production of the missile system. It was stated that the SAMP/T air defense system project, which was stopped at the end of 2019 due to Turkey's launch of Operation Peace Spring in Syria, came to the agenda at the NATO Summit, and that Turkey, France and Italy would revive the project.

 Ukraine 

 In 22 Jan, 2023 Ukraine is expected to receive a battery of the SAMP/T from Italy and France.

See also

 Anti-aircraft warfare
 Anti-ballistic missile
 Barak 8
 CAMM

 HQ-9
 List of missiles
 MIM-104 Patriot
 PAAMS
 RIM-161 Standard Missile 3
 RIM-162 ESSM
 RIM-174 Standard ERAM
 RIM-66 Standard
 RIM-67 Standard
 S-300 (missile)
 S-400 (missile)
 S-500 (missile)
 Surface-to-air missile
 Tor missile system
 Type 3 Chū-SAM
 Khordad 15 (air defense system)

References

External links

 SAMP/T Aster 30 Mamba Surface-to-air defence missile system (armyrecognition.com)
 Video – HMS Diamond fires Aster 30 missile, 2012
 MBDA Aster 15 & 30 PAAMS
 MBDA Aster 15 SAAM
 Eurosam Aster page
 
 

21st-century surface-to-air missiles
Naval surface-to-air missiles
Naval surface-to-air missiles of France
Anti-ballistic missiles of France
Military equipment introduced in the 2000s